Zaborye is the name of several rural localities in Russia:
Zaborye, Vinogradovsky District, Arkhangelsk Oblast, a village in Vinogradovsky District, Arkhangelsk Oblast
Zaborye, Beryozovsky District, Perm Krai, a village in Beryozovsky District, Perm Krai